Trevor Lloyd (21 December 1863 – 11 September 1937) was a New Zealand artist, illustrator and cartoonist.

Lloyd was born in Wade (now called Silverdale), north of Auckland, New Zealand, on 21 December 1863 to Henry and Hannah (née Miles) Lloyd. Lloyd’s work is evocative of the New Zealand bush and his work often contained Maori motifs. Lloyd exhibited with the Auckland Society of Arts in 1883, 1896, 1898, 1899 and 1907 and in 1927 at the New Zealand Academy of Fine Arts. Some examples of his work are available online.

Lloyd was employed as an illustrator for New Zealand Illustrated Magazine from November 1901 until its last edition in 1905 (in which he was acknowledged). He also worked as an illustrator for Auckland Weekly News and as a cartoonist for The New Zealand Herald, retiring in 1936 after 34 years.

Lloyd commissioned a mansion in Mount Eden, Auckland, that was built in 1925–26. Known as Whare Tane, the avant-garde residence is registered by Heritage New Zealand as a Category I building.
 
Both of his daughters, Connie and Olive were artists in their own right.

Lloyd died on 11 September 1937, aged 73, in Auckland.

References

1863 births
1937 deaths
New Zealand cartoonists
New Zealand illustrators
Artists from Auckland